Malcolm Laney (1910 – March 24, 1985) was a head coach for the Alabama men's basketball team (1944–1945), the Alabama golf team (1952–1954) and an assistant coach for the Alabama football team (1944–1957). He was also the head football coach at Woodlawn High School in Birmingham, Alabama (1934–1943).

Early years
John Malcolm Laney was born in 1910 at Ragland, Alabama. He later moved to Birmingham and attended Phillips High School in Birmingham where he played on both the football and basketball teams. After one year at Birmingham–Southern College, Laney transferred to the University of Alabama. At Alabama, he lettered on the men's basketball team as a guard for the 1930, 1931 and 1932 seasons. He played on the squad with his brother Walton Laney and was a part of the undefeated 1930 squad led by head coach Hank Crisp. After he graduated in 1932, Laney coached a YMHA team in Birmingham before he became the head football coach at Woodlawn High School.

Coaching career

Basketball
After not fielding a team for the 1943–1944 season due to the effects of World War II, on December 29, 1944, Alabama athletic director Hank Crisp announced Laney as the new basketball head coach. Prior to his appointment with the Crimson Tide, Laney had served as a basketball referee over the previous 15 years. During his only season as head coach, he led Alabama to a record of ten wins and five losses (10–5).

Football
In 1934, Laney entered his first season as head football coach at Woodlawn High School in Birmingham, Alabama. He remained at Woodlawn through the 1943 season and ended his high school coaching career with the Colonials with an overall record of 76 wins and 14 losses (76–14). Additionally, during his tenure as head coach, Woodlawn captured seven Birmingham city championships and five state championships. While there, some of the future stars he coached included Harry Gilmer, Earl Fullilove, Holt Rast and Travis Tidwell, and each would later become a member of a College Football All-America Team. From Woodlawn, he went on to serve as an assistant coach with the Alabama football team from 1944 to 1957 under both coaches Harold Drew and Jennings B. Whitworth.

Golf
From 1952 through the 1954 seasons, Laney coached the Alabama golf team. During his tenure as head coach, Laney led the Crimson Tide to an overall record of 23 wins and four losses (23–4). He was also the coach for Bobby Hill when he captured Alabama's first SEC golf championship in 1952.

Later life
After his tenure as a coach ended, Laney continued to serve at Alabama as a field representative for the University Alumni Office from 1958 until his retirement 1972. In 1975, he was appointed interim director of Alumni Affairs. He started Camp Laney, a boys summer camp that still survives to this day, at Mentone, Alabama in 1959. In recognition for his contributions to sport in the state, Laney was inducted into the Alabama Sports Hall of Fame on February 18, 1984. He died on March 24, 1985 at Tuscaloosa, Alabama.

Head coaching record

College basketball

References

1910 births
1985 deaths
American men's basketball players
Basketball coaches from Alabama
Guards (basketball)
Alabama Crimson Tide football coaches
Alabama Crimson Tide men's basketball coaches
Alabama Crimson Tide men's basketball players
Alabama Crimson Tide men's golf coaches
Birmingham–Southern Panthers football players
High school football coaches in Alabama
People from Ragland, Alabama
Players of American football from Alabama
Basketball players from Alabama